This is a list of artists that are currently or formerly signed to SRC Records. The label is home to many acts. An asterisk (*) denotes an artist who no longer records for the label.

A
 Akon (Konvict/SRC)
 American Yard (Konvict Ent)
 Asher Roth(SchoolBoy)
 Aubrey O'Day

B
 David Banner
 Baby Bash(*)
 The Beatnuts(*)

C
 Cam'Ron
 Camp Lo

D
 David Banner
 Def Squad (Def Squad/SRC)
 DirtyRap (Loud/SRC)

L
 La The Darkman (Aphilliates Music Group/Embassy Entertainment/SRC)

M
 Marky
 Jae Millz (Wanna Blow/SRC)(*) (Former Artist- now with Young Money)
 Melanie Fiona (Title9/SRC)

P
 Pharoahe Monch

R
 Remy Ma(*)
 Ray J

S
 Shontelle (SRC)
 Keith Sweat

T
 Tami Chynn
 T-Boz (Rowdy/SRC/FYI/Cash Money/Universal Motown)
 Terror Squad (Terror Squad/SRC)(*)

W
 Wu-Tang Clan (Loud/SRC)

See also
 Loud Records
 SRC Records

 
SRC